Victoria is a suburb of the New Zealand city of Gisborne. It is located close to the shore of Poverty Bay, to the southeast of the city centre, between the mouth of the Awapuni Creek and Awapuni.

The suburb was named after Queen Victoria.

Parks

Victoria features Waikanae Beach and a beach walkway.

References

Suburbs of Gisborne, New Zealand